The Hyannisport Club is a private club with an 18-hole golf course located at 2 Irving Avenue (at Scudder Avenue) in Hyannis Port, Massachusetts, United States.

History 
In 1897, the club was founded when John Reid first laid out a 6-hole course for friends. In 1902, the club hired Alex Findlay to build 3 additional holes. In 1903, the course was finalized as 9-hole course. The course is an original Donald Ross design which plays 6,257 yards from the blue tee markers. While the course is short in terms of yardage, it is often called "the toughest 6200 yards in golf" because of the famous Hyannisport wind which usually blows directly off of Nantucket Sound. The club boasts some of the most scenic views on Cape Cod and is known for having water visible on every hole although coincidentally, there are no water hazards on the course. The course is located about a half mile north of the Kennedy Compound and a few of the Kennedy family have been members of the club.

According to golflink.com, "The 18-hole "Hyannisport" course ... features 6,257 yards of golf from the longest tees for a par of 71 . The course rating is 70.0 and it has a slope rating of 121 on Bent grass.  Designed by Donald J. Ross, ASGCA, the Hyannisport golf course opened in 1897. Steve Klemenz manages the course as the General Manager."

The Club hosts "The Seagulls" golf tournament in late March or early April each year. The tournament is open to all Cape Cod residents and has been played in all types of weather from freezing rain and snow to 90 degree heat. The Hyannisport Club is also known for its prestigious Caddy program, which operates each summer from July 1 to August 31.

Notable Members
Ethel Kennedy
John Havlicek, NBA Hall of Famer
Pat Bradley (golfer), Hall of Fame golfer
John P. Riley Jr., Hall of Fame hockey, Coach of 1960 U.S. Gold Medal winning hockey team

Tournaments hosted 

 1958 Massachusetts Open with Bob Toski as winner
 1959 Massachusetts Open with George Kinsman as winner

References

External links

Official Yardage Book

1897 establishments in Massachusetts
Buildings and structures in Barnstable, Massachusetts
Golf clubs and courses designed by Donald Ross
Golf clubs and courses in Massachusetts
Sports in Barnstable County, Massachusetts
Sports venues completed in 1897
Tourist attractions in Barnstable County, Massachusetts